Barrhead-Morinville-Westlock was a provincial electoral district in Alberta, Canada, mandated to return a single member to the Legislative Assembly of Alberta using the first-past-the-post method of voting from 2004 to 2019.

The Barrhead-Morinville-Westlock electoral district included the towns of Barrhead, Morinville, Westlock, Swan Hills, and Legal as well as numerous smaller hamlets.

History
The Barrhead-Morinville-Westlock electoral district was created in the 2004 electoral boundary re-distribution from the defunct Barrhead-Westlock riding which had formed in 1993. The riding was created by merging Barrhead-Westlock with the western portion of Redwater which had been split to make Athabasca-Redwater.

The 2010 electoral boundary re-distribution saw the boundaries revised to include a portion of land from the Lesser Slave Lake electoral district. The portion of land in the district that was part of Sturgeon County was transferred to Spruce Grove-Sturgeon-St. Albert.

The Barrhead-Morinville-Westlock electoral district was dissolved in the 2017 electoral boundary re-distribution, and portions of the district would form the newly created Athabasca-Barrhead-Westlock and Morinville-St. Albert electoral districts.

Boundary history

Representation history

The riding was created in the 2004 boundary redistribution. Its predecessor districts Barrhead-Westlock had been solidly represented by Progressive Conservative and while Redwater saw a mixture of Liberal and Progressive Conservative MLA's returned in recent decades.

Former Speaker of the Assembly Ken Kowalski had served as a member in the area since winning a by-election in 1979. Prior to being Speaker he had previously held some cabinet portfolios in the Alberta government. He was returned to office when the district was created in 2004 and re-elected in 2008 with landslide pluralities.

The 2012 election saw a closely contested race with Progressive Conservative candidate Maureen Kubinec defeating former senator-in-waiting Link Byfield by a few hundred votes to hold the district.

Legislature results

2004 general election

2008 general election

2012 general election

2015 general election

Senate nominee results

2004 Senate nominee election district results

Voters had the option of selecting 4 Candidates on the Ballot

2012 Senate nominee election district results

Student Vote results

2004 election

On November 19, 2004 a Student Vote was conducted at participating Alberta schools to parallel the 2004 Alberta general election results. The vote was designed to educate students and simulate the electoral process for persons who have not yet reached the legal majority. The vote was conducted in 80 of the 83 provincial electoral districts with students voting for actual election candidates. Schools with a large student body that reside in another electoral district had the option to vote for candidates outside of the electoral district then where they were physically located.

2012 election

See also
List of Alberta provincial electoral districts

References

External links
Elections Alberta
The Legislative Assembly of Alberta

Former provincial electoral districts of Alberta
Barrhead, Alberta
Westlock County